She's Got Everything may refer to:

"She's Got Everything (The Kinks song)", a song by The Kinks that was the B-side of "Days"
"She's Got Everything", a song by Krokus from Hardware
"She's Got Everything", a song by White Lion
"She's Got Everything", a song by The Romantics from The Romantics
"She's Got Everything", a song by The Smugglers
She's Got Everything (1937 film), a 1937 film starring Gene Raymond and Ann Sothern